Rifugio Guido Rey is a refuge in the Cottian Alps, near the village of Beaulard, in Piedmont region, Italy.

History
The hut, which belongs to the Club Alpino Italiano (CAI-Uget branch of  Torino), was realised restoring a former military building.

References

External links

Mountain huts in the Alps
Mountain huts in Piedmont